Burchett is a surname. Notable people with the surname include:

Josiah Burchett, British Secretary of the Admiralty (1694–1742)
Wilfred Burchett, Australian war journalist, alleged KGB agent, and first Westerner to cover the aftermath of the dropping of the atom bomb on Hiroshima (1911–1983)
Tim Burchett, the U.S. representative for 
James Burchett, Australian, Justice on the Federal Court of Australia and President of the Copyright Tribunal
George Burchett, English tattoo artist popular with the wealthy upper class of England and royalty including King George V
Rick Burchett, American illustrator, comics artist for Batman, Superman, the Flash, Blackhawk, and American Flagg
Mark Burchett, Hollywood film director and producer, horror movies
Thomas Burchett, Mayor of Rye, Sussex, England, elected 1538

See also
Burchett's Green, Berkshire, England
Burchett Way, located in the London Borough of Barking and Dagenham

References